Adrian Ungur (born 13 December 1971) is a retired Romanian football striker.

International career
Ungur played one game at international level for Romania in a friendly match which ended with a 2–1 victory on Changwon Civil Stadium against South Korea.

Honours
UTA Arad
Divizia B: 1992–93

References

1971 births
Living people
Romanian footballers
FC UTA Arad players
FC U Craiova 1948 players
Hapoel Kfar Saba F.C. players
Hapoel Petah Tikva F.C. players
Association football forwards
Liga I players
Liga II players
Israeli Premier League players
Romanian expatriate footballers
Expatriate footballers in Israel
Romanian expatriate sportspeople in Israel
Romania international footballers
Sportspeople from Craiova